South Broken Hill is a suburb of the western New South Wales city of Broken Hill in outback Australia. The suburb is located in the City of Broken Hill local government area, separated by the "Line of Lode" from the rest of the city. The Silver City Highway running to Wentworth runs through the suburb.

The suburb was previously known as Alma, which gave its name to the electoral district of Alma from 1894 to 1904.

Heritage listings
South Broken Hill has a number of heritage-listed sites, including:
 Piper Street: Central Mine Manager's Residence

References

Suburbs of Broken Hill, New South Wales